Alan Byrne (born 21 December 1985) is an Irish hurler who played as a right wing-back for the Tipperary senior team.

Born in Ballinderry, County Tipperary, Byrne first played competitive hurling during his schooling at Flannans College Ennis winning Harty Cup Medals. He arrived on the inter-county scene at the age of twenty when he first linked up with the Tipperary under-21 team. He made his senior debut during the 2006 Waterford Crystal Cup. Byrne subsequently became a regular member of the team and won one National Hurling League medal.

At club level Byrne began his career with Shannon Rovers. He currently plays with Michael Cusack's in Sydney.

Throughout his career Byrne made 3 championship appearances for Tipperary. He left the senior panel after the conclusion of the 2008 championship, however, he returned to inter-county action as a member of the intermediate team over the following three years.

Honours

Tipperary
Munster Senior Hurling Championship (1): 2008
National Hurling League (1): 2008
Munster Under-21 Hurling Championship (1): 2006
Fitzgibbon Cup All Ireland Colleges Winners: 2005, 2007

References

1985 births
Living people
Hurling backs
Tipperary inter-county hurlers
Shannon Rovers (Tipperary) hurlers